Luiz Carlos "Lula" Bezerra Pereira (6 June 1956 – 7 February 2021) was a Brazilian football player and manager.

Career
Born in Olinda, Pereira played for Sport Recife, Santa Cruz and Ceará.

After retiring as a player he worked as a coach at Ceará and also later managed them. He also managed Flamengo in 2002, as well as other clubs including Ferroviário, Portuguesa, Botafogo-SP, Figueirense, Brasiliense, Guarani, Bahia, Criciúma, América de Natal, Paysandu and América Mineiro.

He died on 7 February 2021, aged 64, due to heart problems caused by a stroke in 2019.

References

1956 births
2021 deaths
Brazilian footballers
Sport Club do Recife players
Santa Cruz Futebol Clube players
Ceará Sporting Club players
Brazilian football managers
Ceará Sporting Club non-playing staff
Ceará Sporting Club managers
CR Flamengo managers
Botafogo Futebol Clube (SP) managers
Figueirense FC managers
Brasiliense Futebol Clube managers
Esporte Clube Bahia managers
Esporte Clube Vitória managers
Criciúma Esporte Clube managers
América Futebol Clube (RN) managers
Paysandu Sport Club managers
América Futebol Clube (MG) managers
Al-Hazm FC managers
Brazilian expatriate sportspeople in Saudi Arabia
Expatriate football managers in Saudi Arabia
Saudi Professional League managers
People from Olinda
Association footballers not categorized by position
Sportspeople from Pernambuco